Treat Huey and Dominic Inglot were the defending champions, but Huey decided to compete in Valencia instead. Inglot played alongside Florin Mergea, but lost in the semifinals to Vasek Pospisil and Nenad Zimonjić.
Pospisil and Zimonjić went on to win the title, defeating Marin Draganja and Henri Kontinen in the final, 7–6(15–13), 1–6, [10–5].

Seeds

Draw

Draw

Qualifying

Seeds

Qualifiers
  Colin Fleming /  Jonathan Marray

Qualifying draw

References
 Main Draw
 Qualifying Draw

Swiss Indoors - Doubles
2014 Davidoff Swiss Indoors